Self-levelling may refer to:

Self-levelling suspension
Self-leveling paint
Self compacting concrete
Self-leveling compound